Sir Hugh McManus O'Donnell (Irish: Sir Aodh mac Maghnusa Ó Domhnaill; died c. 1600) was an Irish Gaelic lord. He was The O'Donnell of his clan, and king of Tyrconnell in medieval Ireland.

Biography
O'Donnell's first marriage was to Iníon Dubh. In the 1580s, a violent succession dispute broke out amongst the O'Donnells over who would succeed him. He abdicated in favour of his eldest son by his second wife, Hugh Roe O'Donnell, in 1592. He lived in retirement until his death 1600, by which time Tyrone's Rebellion was in full flight.

Family
From his first marriage, their children were:
Donnchadh (Duncan) "Scaite"
Sir Donnell (d. 1590)
Ruaidhri (Rory)  (d. 1575)
Siobhán (Joan), (d. January 1591), married Hugh, 2nd Earl of Tyrone, in 1574.
unknown daughter, married a son of Sir Turlough Luineach O'Neill.

His second marriage was to Fionnghuala (Fiona) MacDonald, known by the Irish nickname Iníon Dubh, daughter of James MacDonald, 6th of Dunnyveg and Agnes Campbell, their children were:
Nuala, married Niall Garve O'Donnell
Hugh Roe (c. 1572 – 10 September 1602)
Rory (c. 1575 – 1 August 1608), later Earl of Tyrconnell, married Brigid FitzGerald
Maghnus (Manus)
Mairghead (Margaret)
Máire (Mary) (d. 1662), married firstly Sir Donnell Ó Cathain and later Tadhg O'Rourke.
Cathbarr (d. 1608)
Gráinne

Family tree

Notes

References

1540s births
1600s deaths
Kings of Tír Chonaill
16th-century Irish monarchs
People of Elizabethan Ireland
People from County Donegal